Restored is the fourth studio album by American contemporary Christian musician Jeremy Camp. It was released on November 16, 2004 by BEC Recordings.

Track listing

Standard release

Enhanced edition

Deluxe gold edition

Standard Australian release

Personnel 
 Jeremy Camp – lead and backing vocals, acoustic guitar (1, 2, 3, 5–8, 10, 12)
 Andy Dodd – keyboards and programming (1, 3, 7, 9, 10, 12), electric guitar (1, 3, 7, 9, 10, 12)
 Adam Watts – keyboards and programming (1, 3, 9), drums (1, 3, 7, 9, 10, 12), additional electric guitar outro (12)
 Aaron Sprinkle – keyboards (2, 4, 5, 11), programming (2, 4, 8), electric guitar (2, 4, 5, 6, 8, 11), percussion (2, 4, 5, 6, 8, 11), bass (4), Rhodes (8)
 Zach Hodges – acoustic piano (6)
 Dave Van Liew – electric guitar solo (8), electric guitar (11)
 Nic Rodriguez – bass (1, 3, 7, 9, 10, 12)
 Nick Barber – bass (2, 5, 6, 8, 11)
 Joey Sanchez – drums (2, 4, 5, 6, 8, 11)
 Cameron Stone – cello (12)
 Brandon Roberts – string arrangements and conductor (3, 10)
 Phil Peterson – string arrangements and performer (5)
 Adrienne Camp – backing vocals (1, 5, 8)

Production 
 Tracks #1, 3, 7, 9, 10, 12 and Tracks #14, 15, 16 from Deluxe Gold Edition produced and engineered by Adam Watts and Andy Dodd at Red Decibel Studios (Orange, CA).
 Drums recorded at Sonikwire (Irvine, CA); Drum Tech – Mike Jackson; Assistant engineer – Alex Bush.
 Tracks #2, 4, 5, 6, 8, 11 and Track #13 from Deluxe Gold Edition produced and recorded by Aaron Sprinkle at Compound Recording (Seattle, WA).
 Drum Tech –  Aaron Mlasko
 Tracks #1, 2, 3, 7, 10 & 12 mixed by Chris Lord-Alge at Image Recording (Hollywood, CA), assisted by Keith Armstrong.
 Tracks #4, 5, 6, 8, 11 and Tracks #13-16 from Deluxe Gold Edition, mixed by JR McNeely at Compound Recording (Seattle, WA), assisted by Adam Deane (Tracks 5, 8 & 11) and Austin Thomason (Tracks 4 & 6).
Track #9 mixed by Scott Humphrey 
 Executive Producer – Brandon Ebel
 Mastered by Brian "Big Bass" Gardner for Bernie Grundman Mastering (Hollywood, CA).
 Photography by Brandon Dickerson
 Art Direction and Design by Asterik Studio and Brad Davis.
 Management – Matt Balm

Accolades
In 2006, the album was nominated for a Dove Award for Pop/Contemporary Album of the Year at the 37th GMA Dove Awards. The song "Lay Down My Pride" was also nominated for Rock Recorded Song of the Year.

References

Jeremy Camp albums
BEC Recordings albums
2004 albums